A Few Small Repairs is the fourth studio album by American singer-songwriter Shawn Colvin. It was released on October 1, 1996 by Columbia Records.

Background
A Few Small Repairs is a concept album about divorce, as Colvin's marriage was ending. At the time of the album's release, she had relocated to Austin, Texas.  The album cover consists of a painting by Colvin's friend Julie Speed of a three-eyed woman with a lit match, which inspired Colvin to write the song "Sonny Came Home". Colvin found the painting so arresting that she knew she wanted to use it as the cover before the songwriting and recording were done.

Singles
A Few Small Repairs was supported by four singles. The album's biggest single, released in 1997, was "Sunny Came Home", which peaked on the Billboard Hot 100 at number 7, and topped the Adult Contemporary, Adult Top 40, and Top 40 Adult Recurrents charts the same year.

Another notable song from the album was "Nothin' on Me", which peaked at number 24 on Billboards Adult Top 40 chart. The song was also used on Suddenly Susan as its theme song from 1997 to 2000. Colvin appeared on the show in the second season episode Ready ... aim ... Fong!. She performed the song on the show.

Reception

Critical reception

Commercial performance
A Few Small Repairs peaked at number 39 on the Billboard 200 chart.

Awards
Grammy success came to Colvin two years after the release of A Few Small Repairs. In the 1997 Grammy Awards, she was nominated for Best Female Pop Vocal Performance award for "Get Out of This House" and Best Pop Album for A Few Small Repairs. At the next year's Grammy Awards, Colvin was nominated for Song of the Year and Record of the Year for "Sunny Came Home". She won both awards (sharing Song of the Year with Leventhal). As Colvin was about to begin her speech after winning Song of the Year, rapper Ol' Dirty Bastard stormed the stage protesting his loss of an award that same night, saying, "...I don't know how you all see it, but when it comes to the children, Wu-Tang is for the children..." leading him to be escorted off stage. Colvin then began her speech, remarking, "I'm confused now!"

Track listing

Notes
 "What I Get Paid For" does not appear on North American pressings of the album, therefore reducing the number of tracks to 12.

Personnel
Credits adapted from the liner notes of A Few Small Repairs.
Musicians 
Shawn Colvin – All vocals (2, 5–8, 12), lead vocals (1, 3–4, 9–10, 13), background vocals (4), acoustic guitar (tracks 1, 5, 8–10, 12–13), additional guitars (6), piano (7), handclaps (2)
Chris Botti – trumpet (4)
Bob Carlisle – French horn (3)
Rick Depofi – tenor saxophone (4), clarinet (7), bass clarinet (3), piccolo flute (9), recorder instrument (9)
Larry Farrell – trombone (3–4)
Danny Ferrington – background vocals (4)
Tony Kadlek – flugelhorn (3)
John Leventhal – All guitars (2), electric guitar (12), additional guitars (1, 3–6, 8–10, 12–13), pedal steel guitar (6), mandolin (1), keyboards (1–5, 8–10, 12–13), organ played by (6), violin (1), additional percussion (1, 3–6, 8–10, 13), harmonica (2, 4), background vocals (4, 9, 13)
Lyle Lovett – harmony vocals (3)
Kate Markowitz – harmony vocals (1, 4), background vocals (4)
Eugene Moye – cello (2, 7–8)
Judith Owen – harmony vocals (10)
Mark Plati – bass played by (4)
Sandra Park – violin (2, 7–8)
Shawn Pelton – drums (1–6, 8–10, 13), percussion (2, 4–5)
Michael Rhodes – bass guitar (1, 3, 6, 9–10)
Robert Rinehart – viola (2, 7–8)
Carol Webb – violin (2, 7–8)

Production 
Scott Ansell – additional recording engineer 
Joe Blaney – recording engineer 
Malcolm Burn – record producer (11)
Bob Clearmountain – audio mixing
Paul Dieter – additional recording engineer 
Bill Emmons – assistant recording engineer 
Ryan Freeland – mixing assistant
Troy Gonzalez – assistant recording engineer
Aaron Keane – assistant recording engineer 
Peter Keppler – additional recording engineer, assistant recording engineer 
Fred Kevorkian – additional recording engineer 
John Leventhal – record producer (1–10, 12–13), recording engineer 
Mark Plati – recording engineer 
Fred Remmert – additional recording engineer 
Tom Schick – assistant recording engineer

References

1996 albums
Columbia Records albums
Shawn Colvin albums
Concept albums
Albums produced by John Leventhal
Works about divorce
Albums produced by Malcolm Burn